Steven Lang may refer to:

 Steven Lang (comics), a fictional character, a supervillain in the Marvel Comics universe
 Steven Lang (footballer) (born 1987), Swiss footballer

See also
 Steve Lang (1949–2017), Canadian musician 
 Stephen Lang (born 1952), American actor and playwright